Chalcosyrphus eunotus is a species of hoverfly in the family Syrphidae.

Distribution
Romania.

References

Eristalinae
Insects described in 1873
Diptera of Europe
Taxa named by Hermann Loew